The Overture to an Italian Comedy for orchestra was composed in 1936 by Australian composer Arthur Benjamin; it was first performed in London on 2 March 1937, under the direction of Gordon Jacob.

The piece opens fortissimo, presenting its first main subject in the woodwinds against pizzicato strings and creating a lively mood. The second theme is much softer, and is presented by a solo horn. Following this is a gayer melody for two flutes playing in thirds; this is soon taken up by the trumpets, who are instructed in the score to play in a "vulgar" manner. The opening subject returns, followed again by the "vulgar" theme, and the work ends in spirited fashion.

The overture does not appear to have been inspired by any one piece. The published score is subtitled, "Sorry you've been troubled".

References

Sources
David Ewen, Encyclopedia of Concert Music.New York; Hill and Wang, 1959.

1936 compositions
Compositions by Arthur Benjamin
Concert overtures